The 1917 Detroit Heralds season was the 13th season for the Detroit Heralds, an independent American football team. Led by coach Bill Marshall, the team compiled an 8–2 record.

Tommy Hughitt, Norb Sacksteder, and Birtie Maher starred for the Heralds. Frank Nesser joined the team in late November.

Schedule

Players
 Booth, halfback
 Pat Dunne, fullback
 Edgerton, tackle
 Steamer Horning, tackle
 Tommy Hughitt, quarterback (only appeared in early season games)
 "Nig" Lenahan, halfback/fullback
 Birtie Maher, halfback/end
 Marider, guard
 Danny Mullane, end
 Norb Sacksteder, halfback
 Schlee, guard/tackle
 Shanks, tackle
 G. Shields, guard
 Archie "Dutch" Stewart, center and captain
 Straight, guard
 Carl Thiele, end/tackle
 Lou Usher, center/guard/tackle
 Weekes, quarterback (possibly "Hub" Weekes)
 Whipple, end
 Whitaker/Whittaker, quarterback
 Perce Wilson, halfback/quarterback
 Windbiel, guard/tackle
 Witherbein, tackle

References 

Detroit Heralds seasons
Detroit Heralds